Brimstone is an alias used by several fictional characters appearing in American comic books published by DC Comics.

Fictional character biographies

Artificial construct
Brimstone is a supervillain and artificial construct in the DC Universe, first seen in Legends #1 (Nov 1986).

Within the context of the stories, Brimstone is created by Darkseid as a part of his plot to turn the population of Earth against their superheroes. He does this by implanting a nuclear reactor with a "techno-seed" which modifies it to create a giant, Brimstone. The heroes speculate that it is composed of superheated plasma. It can fly and control lava. Its rampage is stopped by the Suicide Squad when Deadshot shoots the creature's "heart".

A handful of later stories used Brimstone without ever explaining how the construct was recreated every time.

Brimstone is one of the villains sent after Batman and Superman by Lex Luthor. Brimstone is one of a dozen villains who are infected by Starro. His mission is to destroy a nuclear power plant in California. Wonder Girl tries to stop him, but can only delay him long enough for Supergirl to arrive and push Brimstone into space, where he now orbits Earth.

Chris King
Chris King first appears in Legion of Super-Heroes (vol. 2) #272 (February 1981) and was created by Marv Wolfman and Carmine Infantino.

King is a user of the H-Dial, which gives him a new identity and power set each time he uses it. In one mission, he uses the name Brimstone who has the powers of possession and gadgetry.

Nicholas Lucien
Nicholas Lucien first appeared in The Brave and the Bold #200 (July 1983) and was created by Mike W. Barr and Dave Gibbons.

From an early age, Lucien can sense the existence of his Earth-One counterpart in the Multiverse. His resentment of this unseen counterpart leads Lucien to a life of crime. By 1955, Lucien establishes himself as Brimstone the "modern Mephistopheles", who commits Satanic-themed crimes in Gotham City. He has superhuman strength and endurance and is able to generate extremely high temperatures which can produce bursts of flame or be used as a flaming sword. A fight with Batman leaves Lucien in a coma for 28 years. When Lucien awakens in 1983 and finds himself as an inmate at Gotham State Penitentiary, his body has atrophied. Craving vengeance on Batman, Lucien learns that Batman is dead when he was told of it by his cellmate Joker who mocked him. Lucien uses his mind to possess his Earth-One counterpart, who is a businessman and well-respected member of his community. Lucien makes his counterpart adopt the Brimstone identity in an attempt to kill Earth-One's Batman. After this fails upon Batman defeating him, the mind of the Earth-Two Lucien is forced back into its own body. As a side-effect of his mental projection across the dimensional barrier, Lucien is completely paralyzed.

The New 52
A version of Brimstone exists in The New 52 universe, mentioned as being an enemy of Goldrush. He was defeated by Goldrush when he attempted to incinerate Dallas, Goldrush's base of operations.

Joseph Chamberlain 
Joseph Chamberlian first appeared in The Curse of Brimstone #1 (June 2018) and was created by Justin Jordan and Philip Tan.

Chamberlain was born in a dying coal town and made a deal with the devil to become Brimstone. He has a demonic transformation that gives him the power to project and manipulate Hellfire, among other superhuman qualities. Joseph Chamberlain was born to a coal miner named Darren Chamberlain and had a sister named Annie. He lived in York Hills, a small but semi-prosperous town in the middle of nowhere. Joe's father was injured in a tunnel collapse, permanently damaging his leg. Eventually, the coal mines of York Hills dried up and the town soon lost its economic use. Many people left the town for new experiences and the schools shut down, however Joe could not move due to his father's disability and his lack of job experience. If someone wanted a job they needed to leave town, which required a car, which required a job to obtain. Fortunately, Joe was able to buy a car. This car soon broke down and he was picked up by a good Samaritan. The Samaritan introduced himself as "the Salesman" and told Joe that he had been sent to York Hills by a group known as the Home Office. The Salesman told Joe that he could put York Hills on the map and that he wanted Joe to be one of his agents in charge of renovating the dead town. Joe eagerly agreed and he shook the Salesman's hand in agreement. When he touched the Salesman's hand, Joe quickly began undergoing a dramatic transformation into a creature of Hellfire known as Brimstone. The Salesman then revealed that he was a powerful entropic entity who planned to put York Hills on the map by killing all of its inhabitants, an act that Brimstone would carry out. A short time later, Joe woke up in his bed to find Annie watching over him. Annie explained that she had found Joe naked on the mountain side and had brought him home. All of a sudden, the houses in the town had lit on fire, but were soon put out by an ongoing blizzard. After telling Annie what had happened on the mountain side, the pair decided to investigate whether the Salesman had ever appeared before. Eventually they found a subreddit listing small towns like York Hills that were destroyed in "freak weather accidents", which the pair believed that the Salesman's agents were responsible for. Joe and Annie travelled to the only hotel in town where the Salesman would be staying. They found his room empty, except for clothes and a ledger. The Salesman's ledger contained his previous transactions, confirming that his agents had destroyed all the towns. Abruptly, all of the phones in the building began to ring. Annie picked up one of the phones and was greeted by the voice of the Salesman. The Salesman told the pair that he had kidnapped their father. Joe and Annie were then met by the arrival of the woman responsible for the blizzard. This woman was another of the Salesman's agents known as the Hound, whose domain was ice rather than fire. She, too, had been tricked into a bargain with the Salesman and destroyed her town; however, she had accepted her role afterwards. Joe activated his Brimstone transformation and began attacking the Hound. He was quickly overwhelmed by the Hound, but he was able to escape when Annie slammed a truck into the Hound. Annie and Joe soon found themselves being chased by the Hound. Eventually, they pulled up to make a stand, but discovered the Salesman waiting for them. The Salesman was accompanied by Joe's father, who was still being held hostage. The Salesman ordered Joe to fulfill the task that he had been assigned, so that the world would be more hospitable for the Home Office when they arrived. Enraged at the Salesman, Joe tackled him to the floor and tried to destroy him, but was stopped by the Hound, who quickly began to overwhelm him. Just as Brimstone was about to be executed, Joe's father tackled the Hound. The Hound froze Joe's father to death, causing Joe's anger to overcharge. Joe's emotional spike caused him to explode in a burst of Hellfire, turning the entire town to ash. In the aftermath only Joe and Annie survived, the Hound was dead and the Salesman was gone. Annie and Joe decided that they must stop a tragedy like this from ever happening again and so went on a road trip with the Salesman's ledger, which contained the locations of his next targets.

Other versions
The artificial construct appears in Tiny Titans comics.

In other media

Television
 A nuclear-powered robot resembling Brimstone appears in the Justice League Unlimited episode "Initiation". Though not named onscreen, it was identified as Brimstone in the DVD extra "Themes of Justice".
 An amalgam of Brimstone and Plasmus appears in Young Justice: Outsiders. Ana and Otto Von Furth (voiced by Grey Griffin and Yuri Lowenthal respectively) were siblings who were transformed into Plasma and Plasmus, respectively, after being kidnapped by a metahuman trafficking ring, experimented on by Dr. Simon Ecks, and placed under the Light's mind control. Ana was accidentally killed by Black Lightning when her heart gave out while being forced to fight the Justice League while Otto is killed by a concerned citizen, believing he was a monster.
 Brimstone appears in a flashback in the first season of Harley Quinn.
 A live-action version of Brimstone is portrayed by Philip Michael Thomas in Superboy in the season two episode "Brimstone."

Film
The artificial construct incarnation of Brimstone makes a cameo appearance in Superman/Batman: Public Enemies.

Miscellaneous
Brimstone appears in The All-New Batman: The Brave and the Bold #5 (May 2011).

References

Reference group

External links
 Brimstone (artificial construct) at DC Wiki

Characters created by John Byrne (comics)
Characters created by John Ostrander
Characters created by Len Wein
DC Comics characters
Fictional giants